The 1980 PSA Men's World Open Squash Championship is the men's edition of the 1980 World Open, which serves as the individual world championship for squash players. The event took place in Adelaide in Australia from 4 October until 10 October 1980. Geoff Hunt won his fourth consecutive World Open title, defeating Qamar Zaman in the final for the third successive year.

Seeds

Draw and results

First round

Main draw

See also
PSA World Open

References

External links
World Squash History

M
World Squash Championships
Squash tournaments in Australia
1980 in Australian sport
Sports competitions in Adelaide
International sports competitions hosted by Australia
October 1980 sports events in Australia
1980s in Adelaide